Space Between the Words is the first solo album by Dan Le Sac, released on Sunday Best Recordings in 2012.

Track listing

References

External links
 

2012 debut albums
Electronic albums by English artists